Weekends is a 2017 American animated film. It was written and directed by Trevor Jimenez, a Canadian-born animator for Pixar, the film depicts Jimenez's own childhood experience as a child of divorced parents, who regularly spent the week living with his mother in Hamilton, Ontario while spending weekends with his father in Toronto.

Jimenez made the film through the co-op program at Pixar, which permits employees to use some company resources to make their own independent short films.

In January 2019, the film was announced as a nominee for the Academy Award for Best Animated Short Film at the 91st Academy Awards.

Accolades

References

External links

2017 animated films
2017 films
American animated short films
Best Animated Short Subject Annie Award winners
Films set in Toronto
2010s English-language films
2010s American films